Jeptha J. Kendrick (1811? - ) was an American politician. He was born in Kentucky. His father, Joseph Kendrick, was born in Virginia. He served as a member of the 1863-1865 California State Assembly, representing California's 1st State Senate district. He represented the 13th district in 1851-1852 and the 1st district from 1856 to 1858.

References

Bibliography
Leaves of a Stunted Shrub: A Genealogy of the Scrogin-Scroggin, Volume 6. Pg. 299.
The Journal of the Senate During the ... Session of the ..., Volume 2
Journals of the Legislature of the State of California, Volumes 1-2

External links
 JoinCalifornia - Jeptha J. Kendrick

  

California state senators
19th-century American politicians
1811 births
Year of death missing